Muğanlı (also, Mughanly) is a village and municipality in the Shamakhi District of Azerbaijan. It has a population of 1,061.

References 

Populated places in Shamakhi District